Floyd County Schools is the school district created to serve the public education needs of Floyd County, Kentucky.

The district has 13 schools serving a total of about six thousand students.

The school district comprises seven elementary schools :
Allen Elementary School, Allen serving grades PK-8 
Betsy Layne Elementary School, Betsy Layne serving grades PK-8 
Duff-Allen Central Elementary School, Eastern serving grades PK-8 
John M. Stumbo Elementary School, Grethel serving grades PK-8 
May Valley Elementary School, Martin serving grades PK-5 
Prestonsburg Elementary School, Prestonsburg serving grades PK-5 
South Floyd Elementary School, Hi Hat serving grades PK-8

At the end of the 2016–17 school year, McDowell and Osborne Elementary closed. The two schools consolidated into a single school at the campus that was occupied by South Floyd High School, which also closed at that time.

There is one middle school serving grades 6-8:
James D. Adams Middle School, Prestonsburg 

And three high schools serving grades 9-12:
Floyd Central High School, Eastern
Betsy Layne High School, Betsy Layne 
Prestonsburg High School, Prestonsburg 

At the end of the 2016–17 school year, Allen Central and South Floyd closed and consolidated into the new Floyd Central High School at a new campus in Eastern.

There are also some schools organized for non-traditional learning:
Floyd County Area Technology Center, Martin, a trade school open to all county high school students. 
Home Instruction Elementary, Prestonsburg 
Home Instruction H.S., Prestonsburg 
Renaissance Learning Center, The local alternative school located in Martin 

In 2020, the Floyd County School of Innovation opened in the same building that houses RLC. Students go for half a day to take classes related to STEM.

References

External links 
 The Floyd County Schools website

School districts in Kentucky
Education in Floyd County, Kentucky